Antipodia atralba, the black and white skipper, is a species of butterfly of the family Hesperiidae. It is found in Australia along the coast of Victoria and South Australia.

The wingspan is about 30 mm.

The larvae feed on Cyperaceae species, including Gahnia ancistrophylla, Gahnia deusta and Gahnia lanigera.

External links
 Australian Caterpillars

Trapezitinae
Butterflies described in 1882
Butterflies of Australia